"Show No Mercy" is a song written and produced by Vanda & Young and performed by New Zealand singer songwriter, Mark Williams. It was released in May 1990 as the lead single from his fifth studio album Mark Williams ZNZ (1990).

Track listings
7" single (Albert Productions 655729)
 "Show No Mercy" – 3:38	
 "Fool No More" – 3:32

12" single / CD Maxi
 "Show No Mercy" (12" mix) – 7:37
 "Show No Mercy" (instrumental) – 4:32
 "Show No Mercy" (album version) – 4:21
 "You're So Cool" – 3:04

Charts

Weekly charts

Year-end charts

Certifications

References

1990 singles
Mark Williams (singer) songs
Songs written by George Young (rock musician)
Songs written by Harry Vanda
Song recordings produced by George Young (rock musician)
Song recordings produced by Harry Vanda
Albert Productions singles
1990 songs